Never Enough is a song by German electronic musician Boris Dlugosch featuring the vocals of Róisín Murphy from Moloko. Dlugosch and Murphy had previously collaborated on the Moloko track "Sing It Back", which became a hit in 1999 after Dlugosch remixed it. Released in June 2001, the song reached number 16 in the United Kingdom, number 26 in Ireland, number 73 in the Netherlands, and number 95 in Germany. In the United States, it reached number three on the Billboard Dance Club Songs chart.

Track listing
European CD-maxi
 "Never Enough" (original radio edit) – 3:51
 "Never Enough" (Chocolate Puma radio edit) – 3:45
 "Never Enough" (original club mix) – 7:16
 "Never Enough" (Chocolate Puma remix) – 7:41
 "Never Enough" (Bini & Martini club mix) – 7:58
 "Never Enough" (Fusion Groove Orchestra vocal mix) – 9:49

Personnel
 Róisín Murphy – vocals, songwriting 
 Boris Dlugosch – production, keyboards, programming
 Mark Brydon – keyboards, engineering, programming
 Ulli Kringler – guitars
 Jurgen Attig – bass
 Michael Lange – drums, additional programming, production
 Gunther Gerl – additional keyboards, mastering

Charts

Release history

References

2001 singles
2001 songs
German dance songs
Positiva Records singles
Songs written by Róisín Murphy
Warner Music Group singles